"Tap" is a song by Canadian rapper Nav, featuring vocals from American rapper Meek Mill. It was sent to rhythmic contemporary radio on May 7, 2019, one day after Meek Mill's 32nd birthday as the second single of Nav's second studio album, Bad Habits. The song peaked at number 87 on the Billboard Hot 100. The song was written by the two artists, along with Amir Esmailian and its producers London on da Track and Westen Weiss, The music video for the song was released on June 13, 2019.

Charts

Weekly charts

Year-end charts

Certifications

Release history

References

External links
 
 

2019 songs
2019 singles
Republic Records singles
Songs written by Meek Mill
Meek Mill songs
Nav (rapper) songs
Songs written by London on da Track
Song recordings produced by London on da Track
Songs written by Nav (rapper)
Songs written by Amir Esmailian
Songs written by Westen Weiss